Mullsjö Municipality is a municipality in Jönköping County, southern Sweden. Its seat is in the locality of Mullsjö.

The municipality was formed in 1952 by the amalgamation of four former entities. In 1998 it was transferred from the dissolved Skaraborg County to Jönköping County.

The geography is known for its many lakes and canoeing waters. In the winter, one may enjoy winter sports activities such as cross-country and down-hill skiing.

There is also a folk high school in Mullsjö.

Localities
There are 2 urban areas (also called a Tätort or locality) in Mullsjö Municipality.

In the table the localities are listed according to the size of the population as of December 31, 2005. The municipal seat is in bold characters.

Sights
Sights within the municipality include the scenic Ryfors Estates, with its park and nearby golfing course. Näs Lagård in Bjurbäck, southern part of Mullsjö, is one of Sweden's most famous places for classical chamber music. Bjurbäcks Konsthall - Artgallery and café. Näs Porthus in Bjurbäck, famous building of cultural historical interest. Also worthwhile is the House of Legends, a museum about Scandinavian folklore, such as trolls, giants, elves and gnomes.

Mullsjö also houses a small skiing resort called Knaggebo which has three different slopes.

References
Statistics Sweden

External links

Mullsjö Municipality - Official site
Coat of arms
Bjurbäck - The official site of Bjurbäck, in southern part of Mullsjö Municipality
Mullsjö Folkhögskola - Mullsjö folk high school.

 
Municipalities of Jönköping County
Skaraborg